Smirnovsky is a rural locality (a settlement) in Korotoyaksky Selsoviet, Khabarsky District, Altai Krai, Russia. The population was 45 as of 2013. It was founded in 1920. There are 2 streets.

Geography 
Smirnovsky is located 30 km northeast of Khabary (the district's administrative centre) by road. Khabarovsky is the nearest rural locality.

References 

Rural localities in Khabarsky District